Cahiers Agricultures is a peer-reviewed open access scientific journal covering research on farming systems worldwide, the way they are changing, and their role in society. The journal publishes articles, short communications, reviews, comments, and replies, mainly in French language. It is published by EDP Sciences and the editor-in-chief is Jean-Yves Jamin (Centre de coopération internationale en recherche agronomique pour le développement). The journal was established in 1992 and it has been published by EDP Sciences since 2016.

Abstracting and indexing
The journal is abstracted and indexed in:

According to the 2021 Journal Citation Reports, the journal has a 2020 impact factor of 1.053.

References

External links

Creative Commons-licensed journals
Publications established in 1992
EDP Sciences academic journals
Agricultural journals
Multilingual journals